John Buana N'Galula (born 23 June 1968) is a retired Zaire international footballer, who played as a defender.

Club career
Born in Kinshasa, moved to Belgium at the age of 23, signing with K. Boom F.C. He would spend the rest of his playing career in the Belgian Pro League, representing K.S.C. Lokeren Oost-Vlaanderen and K.F.C. Lommel S.K.

International career
Buana NGalula played for Zaire at the 1988 and 1992 Africa Cup of Nations finals.

Personal
Buana NGalula was granted Belgian citizenship in 2000.

References

1968 births
Living people
Footballers from Kinshasa
Democratic Republic of the Congo footballers
Democratic Republic of the Congo expatriate footballers
Democratic Republic of the Congo international footballers
1988 African Cup of Nations players
1992 African Cup of Nations players
Belgian Pro League players
K.S.C. Lokeren Oost-Vlaanderen players
K.F.C. Lommel S.K. players
Expatriate footballers in Belgium
Democratic Republic of the Congo expatriate sportspeople in Belgium
Association football defenders
21st-century Democratic Republic of the Congo people